Pirrit Hills is an isolated group of rocky peaks and nunataks about 7 nautical miles (13 km) in extent, lying southward of the Ellsworth Mountains, between the Heritage Range and Nash Hills. The feature was positioned by the U.S. Ellsworth-Byrd Traverse Party in December 1958. It was named by the Advisory Committee on Antarctic Names (US-ACAN) for John Pirrit, a glaciologist with the traverse party who had wintered at Ellsworth Station. Pirrit was scientific leader at Byrd Station in 1959.

See also
 Mount Goodwin, second most prominent summit in Pirrit Hills
 Mountains in Antarctica
 Mount Turcotte

References

External links

Mountains of Ellsworth Land
Nunataks of Ellsworth Land